Blue in the Face is a 1995 American comedy film directed by Wayne Wang and Paul Auster. It stars Harvey Keitel leading an ensemble cast, including Giancarlo Esposito, Roseanne Barr, Michael J. Fox, Lily Tomlin, Victor Argo, Mira Sorvino, Lou Reed, Keith David, Jim Jarmusch, Jared Harris, RuPaul, and Madonna.

Blue in the Face was filmed over a five-day period as a follow-up to Wang's 1995 film Smoke. During production of Smoke, Keitel and the others ad-libbed scenes in-character between takes and a sequel was made using this improvised material.

Lily Tomlin was nominated for an American Comedy Award as "Funniest Supporting Actress in a Motion Picture" for her performance in this picture.

Blue in the Face features songs by singer Selena.  Her bilingual duet with David Byrne, "God's Child (Baila Conmigo)", appears on the film's soundtrack.

Plot
The film once again centers on the Brooklyn Cigar Store and manager Auggie (Harvey Keitel), although most of the other characters are different. The store owner's frustrated wife Dot (Roseanne Barr) is one of them, and one of the plotlines follows her attempts to seduce Auggie. Madonna, Michael J. Fox, Lily Tomlin and Lou Reed as himself also put in appearances.

Cast
 Harvey Keitel as Augustus "Auggie" Wren
 Victor Argo as Vinnie
 Keith David as Jackie Robinson
 Giancarlo Esposito as Tommy Finelli
 Michael J. Fox as Pete Maloney
 Mel Gorham as Violet
 Jared Harris as Jimmy Rose
 Jim Jarmusch as Bob
 Madonna as Singing Telegram Girl
 Lou Reed as Man With Strange Glasses
 Roseanne Barr as Dot
 Mira Sorvino as Young Lady
 Lily Tomlin as Waffle Eater
 Malik Yoba as Watch Man
 Rupaul as Dance Leader

Reception

The film received mixed reviews. On Rotten Tomatoes, the film has a rating of 43% based on reviews from 23 critics, with an average rating of 5.7/10.

Roger Ebert of the Chicago Sun Times gave the film 2.5 out of 4 stars, remarking that the movie "was shot in six days, and sometimes feels like it…Some of the bits work and others don't, but no one seems to be keeping score, and that's part of the movie's charm. Ebert also notes that "Smoke is, of course, a much better film, and if you haven't seen it, then you should start there and not here. Blue in the Face is more of a footnote."

References

External links
 
 
 
 
 FilmCritic.com review

1995 films
Films set in Brooklyn
Films set in New York City
Films about smoking
1995 comedy films
Films directed by Wayne Wang
Films directed by Paul Auster
Films with screenplays by Paul Auster
American comedy films
1990s English-language films
1990s American films